Nalla Theerpu is a 1959 Indian Tamil-language legal drama film directed by T. Prakash Rao and written by Murasoli Maran. The film stars Gemini Ganesan and Jamuna. It was released on 9 April 1963, and emerged a success.

Plot 

A man who works in a bank is imprisoned on a charge of murder that he did not commit. He asks his wife to tell the world her husband is dead and asks her to dress like a widow. He requests her to make their son a lawyer so that he can win the case and get him released. The son turns into an efficient lawyer and wins the case against his father.

Cast 

Male cast
Gemini Ganesan
V. Nagayya
M. G. Chakrapani
S. V. Sahasranamam
T. R. Ramachandran
T. S. Durairaj

Female cast
Jamuna
P. Kannamba
M. N. Rajam
Ragini
Kusalakumari
M. Saroja

Production 
The producer Sundar Lal Nahatha came from Vijayawada to Chennai and set up his own film production company. He produced many films in Tamil, Telugu and Hindi under different banners. This film is one of them produced under the banner Sri Productions.

Soundtrack 
Music was composed by S. M. Subbaiah Naidu, while the lyrics were penned by Ku. Ma. Balasubramaniam, Udumalai Narayana Kavi, Pattukkottai Kalyanasundaram and Suratha.

Release and reception 
Nalla Theerpu was released on 9 April 1959, delayed from March, and fared well at the box office.

References

External links 

1950s legal drama films
1950s Tamil-language films
Films about miscarriage of justice
Indian courtroom films
Indian legal drama films